Suma Park Dam is a concrete arch dam across the Summer Hill Creek in the central west region of New South Wales, Australia. The main purpose of the dam is to supply potable water to the city of Orange. The impounded reservoir is called Suma Park Reservoir.

Location and features
Built in 1962, Suma Park Dam is owned and maintained by Orange City Council. Prior to the construction of Suma Park Dam, Lake Canobolas (then known as Meadow Creek Dam) on the Molong Creek was also used as a domestic water source.

At 100% capacity the dam wall holds back  of water. The uncontrolled  spillway is capable of discharging .

Upgrade
Surveillance and dam safety inspections are conducted regularly by the Orange City Council. In 2005 and 2010, the dam overflowed. In 2011, the Council published a report giving options for raising the height of the dam.

See also

 List of dams and reservoirs in New South Wales

References

External links
 

Dams in New South Wales
Dams completed in 1962
Central West (New South Wales)
Arch dams